Wacky Races: Mad Motors is a 2007 racing video game developed by British studio Coyote Console and published by Blast! Entertainment for the PlayStation 2 video game console. It is based on Wacky Races.

References

2007 video games
Kart racing video games
PlayStation 2 games
PlayStation 2-only games
Racing video games
Video games based on Hanna-Barbera series and characters
Video games developed in the United Kingdom
Video games based on Wacky Races
Cartoon Network video games
Multiplayer and single-player video games